The AGR was an English automobile built by Ariel & General Repairs of Brixton between 1911 and 1915.

The company offered a 10/12 hp 1540 cc four-cylinder model based on the French Hurtu, a marque for which they were agents. The car was slightly longer than the Hurtu and the chassis price for this was £255 for the chassis or £315 with open four-seater coachwork.

See also
 List of car manufacturers of the United Kingdom

References

Vintage vehicles
Defunct motor vehicle manufacturers of England
Motor vehicle manufacturers based in London